Princess Bongnyeong (1096–30 June 1133) was a Goryeo Royal Princess as the youngest daughter of King Sukjong and Queen Myeongui, also their  most favourite and beloved daughter.

She later married her half uncle's son–Wang Yeon the Count Jingang (진강백 왕연). She was said to have a gentle, filial, and diligent personality. Even after getting married, she still achieved solemn virtues, making her loving by both of her parents. Her wealth was the highest among the other royal family members and she was said to be a devout buddhism and revered Dharma by being very hard and passionate in built and decorated the pagodas (탑) and tombs (묘). However, she later died on 30 June 1133 (11th years reign of her nephew) without any issue and her funeral was held at the northwestern foot of Gyeongsan (경산, 京山) a month later.

Legacy
Princess Bongnyeong's epitaph was written by Gim Jeong (김정, 金精) under her brother, the king's order and there, she was called as Royal Woman (왕희, 王姬), Virtuous Woman of the Imperial Clan (종실현녀, 宗室賢女), also Daughter of the Son of Heaven (천자지녀, 天子之女).

According to her epitaph, there was a phrase said:
"The Daughter of the Son of Heaven, like a full moon"천자(天子)의 따님이여, 보름달 같으셨네

From this, many modern scholars believed that Goryeo declared itself as the Heaven's land since it was the country's heyday and can be seen that the goryeo peoples called their ruler as the "Son of Heaven" (천자, 天子) and regarded it as equivalent to the Chinese emperor. Meanwhile, the words "like a full moon" believed to refer to the Princess's bright appearance that is just like a moon.

Her epitaph was once exhibited in the "Revisiting History Letter, Epitaphs of Goryeo" (다시 보는 역사편지, 고려 묘지명) which held by the National Museum of Korea from July 11, 2006, until August 27, 2006.

References

External links 
복녕궁주 on Goryeosa .
복녕궁주 on EToday News .

Goryeo princesses
1133 deaths
1096 births
11th-century Korean women
12th-century Korean women